The European League of Stuttering Associations (ELSA) was set up in 1990 by organisations in 12 countries to promote a greater knowledge and understanding of stuttering and to bring together, as a top umbrella organisation, the national stuttering self-help organisations of Europe.
ELSA is a trans-national, cross-cultural organisation. It seeks resources only open to multi-national groups, extends the exchange-of-information network, and lobbies for stutterers at a prominent international level.

ELSA's work has been recognised by the International Labour Office in Geneva, the World Health Organization in Geneva and the United Nations Office in Vienna. ELSA is also a founding member of the European Disability Forum, an umbrella disability organisation based in Brussels.

Purposes
Its main roles are:

 to link together and further the co-operation of Europe's national organisations.
 to provide a forum for exchange of concepts and experiences in stuttering therapy and self-help.
 to help represent the interests of stutterers to European and international bodies.
 to put stuttering onto the European agenda to ensure that the needs and challenges faced by people who stutter are considered in a European context.

Governance
The current executive board consists of Edwin Farr MBE (Chair), Anita Blom (Vice-Chair) and Richard Bourgondiën (Webmaster).

Publications
The Association publishes a newsletter, One Voice, which is published twice a year and is a joint project with the International Stuttering Association.

International Stuttering Awareness Day (ISAD)
Together with the International Fluency Association and the International Stuttering Association, the International Stuttering Association celebrates, every 22 October, International Stuttering Awareness Day (ISAD) which includes an online conference on stuttering and a media campaign.

See also
 British Stammering Association
 The Indian Stammering Association
International Stuttering Association
 Israel Stuttering Association (AMBI)

References

External links
Official website
The European Disability Forum

Organizations established in 1990
Stuttering associations
European medical and health organizations
1990 establishments in Europe